Joseph Beacham (1874–1958) was an American football player.

Joseph Beacham or Joseph Beecham may also refer to:

Joseph R. Beacham, American music publisher
Joseph Beecham (1848–1916), British businessman and baronet
Joe Beecham, Ghanaian singer

See also
Beacham (surname)